Tympanistes rubidorsalis is a species of moth of the family Nolidae. It is found in Taiwan.

References

Moths described in 1888
Chloephorinae
Moths of Taiwan